Lygus elisus, known generally as the pale legume bug or lucerne plant bug, is a species of plant bug in the family Miridae. It is found in Central America, North America, and Oceania.

References

Further reading

 
 

Lygus
Articles created by Qbugbot
Insects described in 1914